Against All Flags is a 1952 American pirate film directed by George Sherman and Douglas Sirk and starring Errol Flynn as Brian Hawke, Maureen O'Hara as Prudence "Spitfire" Stevens and Anthony Quinn as Roc Brasiliano. The film's plot is set in 1700, when British officer Brian Hawke infiltrates a group of pirates located on Libertatia on the coast of Madagascar, and falls in love with pirate captain "Spitfire" Stevens.

Plot
Lieutenant Brian Hawke, an officer aboard the British merchant ship The Monsoon, volunteers for a dangerous mission to infiltrate the pirates' base at Diego Suarez on the coast of Madagascar. He and two trusted crewmen, Jones and Harris, pose as deserters; to make his disguise more convincing, he is given twenty lashes. When they arrive in Diego Suarez, they arouse the suspicions of the pirates, especially Captain Roc Brasiliano. Brasiliano orders Hawke to appear before a tribunal of the Coast Captains to decide his fate. If they do not believe him, he will be executed. Meanwhile, Hawke has caught the eye of Spitfire Stevens - the only woman among the Coast Captains - who inherited her position from her father. This irritates Brasiliano, who wants Spitfire.

To prove himself, Hawke is forced to duel a pirate (caught stealing from Brasiliano) with boarding pikes, managing to outfight him. He joins Brasiliano's crew. While cruising the shipping lanes, they come across and capture a Moghul vessel crammed with luxuries and vast wealth. Patma, the daughter of the Moghul Emperor, is disguised by her chaperone Molvina MacGregor as just an ordinary woman, then hidden. She falls in love with Hawke after he rescues her from the burning ship, admitting he is only the third man she has ever seen.

When they return to Diego-Suarez, Spitfire becomes jealous of Patma. When Patma is put up for auction, she outbids Hawke (who wanted to protect her from the other pirates) and takes the Indian princess into her service. In a candid moment, Spitfire tells Hawke she is planning to leave for Britain via Brazil and leave her criminal life behind. She wants Hawke to accompany her there. Brasiliano's hatred for Hawke grows.

Hawke gathers information about the pirate base and steals a map of the defences. It is planned that a Royal Navy warship will sail into the harbour, with Hawke disabling the cannons. Hawke gives a signal to the British ship with a flare, and makes sure the Moghul princess is ready to be rescued. Unfortunately, Hawke's plans are uncovered by Brasiliano. Hawke is tied to a stake on the beach, to bitten by crabs and drowned in the rising tide. Spitfire pretends to stab him in the back to end his suffering, but instead cuts the ropes binding him to the stake.

At that moment, a British warship enters the bay. The pirates expect to easily sink it as they had several Portuguese warships that recently attempted to storm the harbour. To their surprise, their cannons explode, having been double-shotted. Faced with imminent defeat and hanging, Brasiliano uses the princess as a human shield to sail away. The British do not dare fire. However, Hawke and his two men have slipped aboard and manage to rescue the hostage and fight off the crew, with Spitfire's help. Hawke eventually duels and kills Brasiliano. Hawke requests and is granted Spitfire's freedom, and the two kiss.

Cast
 Errol Flynn as Brian Hawke
 Maureen O'Hara as Prudence 'Spitfire' Stevens
 Anthony Quinn as Captain Roc Brasiliano
 Alice Kelley as Princess Patma
 Mildred Natwick as Molvina MacGregor
 Robert Warwick as Captain William Kidd
 Harry Cording as Gow
 John Alderson as Jonathan Harris
 Phil Tully as Jones
 Lester Matthews as Sir Cloudsley
 Tudor Owen as Williams
 Maurice Marsac as Captain Moisson
 James Craven as Captain Hornsby
 James Fairfax as Cruikshank - Barber
 Bill Radovich as Hassan

Production

Development
The film was originally written by Aeneas MacKenzie and director Richard Wallace as a vehicle for Douglas Fairbanks, Jr., who had just made Sinbad the Sailor with Wallace. In January 1950 it was announced Fairbanks would make the film for his own company in April or May in Hollywood once he finished making State Secret in England.

However, the film was not produced and Aeneas MacKenzie sold his original script to Universal in July 1950. Alexis Smith and Yvonne De Carlo were mentioned as possible female leads and Jack Gross was assigned to be the producer. The script featured a number of tropes familiar to pirate movies of the time, including a female pirate; it was based on genuine historical characters and situations but very loosely.

William Goetz, head of production, put the project on the shelf until he could find the right star. In August 1951 Errol Flynn signed a one-picture deal with the studio to make the film.

Under his contract with Warner Bros., Flynn was allowed to make one film a year for an outside studio. His contract with Universal meant Flynn was entitled to a percentage of the profits. Filming was delayed so Flynn could make Mara Maru at Warners. During this time the script was rewritten by Joseph Hoffman and Anthony Quinn signed early on as the villain. By November Howard Christie was set as producer, George Sherman as director and Maureen O'Hara the co-star.

Sherman later wrote that Flynn was unsure about the scene where he fenced against a woman. He said "I'm supposed to be the bravest guy on screen? How could I fight a woman?" Sherman had worked with O'Hara before and assured him she was capable of holding her own "with a sword, a gun or her fists if need be" and warned Flynn he needed to be in shape.

Shooting
Filming began in January 1952. It was mostly done on a stage at the Universal Studios in Los Angeles with some location footage shot at Palos Verdes, California. It was Flynn's last Hollywood swashbuckler, as the further three he starred in were all made in Europe.

Flynn exercised a degree of authority on set as changes in his contract meant that he ordered that the days of shooting end at 4.00pm, by which time he would become inebriated.

Maureen O'Hara was wary of working with Flynn after he made an amorous advance on her years before. However she said by the end of filming "he had won me over. I respected him professionally and was quite fond of him personally. Father Time was slowly calming his wicked, wicked ways, and deep within that devilish rogue, I found a kind and fragile soul."

O'Hara said that Flynn "was a pro" who "came to work prepared. He rehearsed hard and practised his fencing sequences very meticulously." O'Hara did admit Flynn drank on set, often smuggling in alcohol by injecting it into oranges and eating the oranges. She said "everything good that we got on film was shot early in the day" and that Flynn would start drinking by morning and be of no use after 4 pm. She had to perform many of her close ups for love scenes opposite a black flag with an "x" on it while a script girl read lines. "It was hard to watch him, very frustrating, but you forgave him because what he had given you earlier in the day had been so terrific."

On 1 February Flynn broke his ankle during filming, with ten more days of filming still to be completed, most of it featuring Flynn. This meant completion of the movie had to be delayed. The ship which had been used in the film had been transformed for the film Yankee Buccaneer and had to be converted back.

On April 18 Flynn returned to shoot the remaining sequences over two days. Because director George Sherman was working on Willie and Joe Back at the Front by then, the scenes were shot by Douglas Sirk.

Anthony Quinn said that he and O'Hara had an affair making Sinbad the Sailor and every time they worked together again - Against All Flags, The Magnificent Matador - they would resume their affair temporarily.

The cast includes "Capt. Black Death" (uncredited), a Black pirate captain played by Emmett Smith which has been described as "a progressive statement on racial equality for its time."

Reception

Critical
The New York Times said Flynn "is a singular man among men and Maureen O'Hara... who is beautiful putty in his hands."

The Chicago Tribune called it "routine and ridiculous".

Filmink magazine called it "a marvellous return to form" for Flynn, being "colourful, escapist entertainment, with a strong script and top-notch cast. Sure, Errol looks dissolute and seedy but he’s still dashing with a twinkle in his eye, and this is easily one of his best movies from the 1950s."

Box Office
O'Hara said the film made "a pot of money". According to Variety it earned $1.6 million in gross rentals in North America in 1953. Despite this Flynn did not work again for Universal for a number of years, leaving the US to live in Europe; he was reunited with the studio on Istanbul.

Remakes
The film was remade in 1967 as The King's Pirate.

References

Bibliography
 McNulty, Thomas. Errol Flynn: the life and career. McFarland & Company, 2004.

 Reid, John Howard. Hollywood's Miracles of Entertainment. Lulu.com, 2005.

External links
 
 
 
 
 Review of film at Variety

1950s historical adventure films
1952 films
American historical adventure films
1950s English-language films
Films directed by George Sherman
Films set in Madagascar
Films set in the 1700s
Pirate films
Cultural depictions of William III of England
Films scored by Hans J. Salter
1950s American films